Cullinan is a surname. Notable people with the surname include:

Cormac Cullinan (fl. 1990s-present), South African attorney and author
Daryll Cullinan (born 1967), South African cricketer
Edward Cullinan (1931–2019), British architect
Joseph S. Cullinan (1860–1937), US oil industrialist
Mark Cullinan (born 1957), South African cricketer
Mary Cullinan (1950–2021), US university president
Patrick Cullinan (1932–2011), South African writer
Shane Cullinan (born 1975), British composer
Thomas Cullinan (diamond magnate), (1862–1936), South African diamond magnate
Thomas A. Cullinan (1838–1904), US law enforcement officer